The Ontario Bar Association is a bar association representing more than 16,000 lawyers, judges, notaries, law teachers, and law students from across Ontario. It is also a branch of the Canadian Bar Association. Approximately two-thirds of all practising lawyers in Canada belong to the CBA.

Established in 1907, the OBA was incorporated on April 22, 1985. It is a voluntary association for legal members, whereas the regulatory body for lawyers in the province is under the Law Society of Ontario.

An essential ally and advocate for members of the legal profession, the organization promotes fair justice systems, facilitates effective law reform, upholds equality in the legal profession and is devoted to eliminating discrimination. The OBA is also the premiere provider of quality professional development and information to members of the legal profession.

The OBA is headed by a President and a 21-member Board of Directors.

Vision and Mission

"To be indispensable to our members, the legal profession and the administration of justice in Ontario."

As the professional association for Ontario's lawyers, judges and law students, the OBA will:
 Advance the interests of our members, the justice system and the rule of law in Ontario;
 Be the leading provider of high quality continuing professional development for lawyers throughout Ontario;
 Support a network where all our members share their practical experience, knowledge and ideas.

Mandate and Priorities

The mandate of the CBA-OBA is to:
 improve the law;
 improve the administration of justice;
 improve and promote access to justice;
 promote equality in the legal profession and in the justice system;
 improve and promote the knowledge, skills, ethical standards and well-being of members of the legal profession;
 represent the legal profession nationally and internationally; and
 promote the interests of the members of CBA.

Sections

The Ontario Bar Association has 40 specialty groups, or Sections, that focus on substantive areas of the law and the legal profession. More than 10,000 members participate in Ontario Sections. They are:

 Aboriginal Law  
 Administrative Law  
 Alternative Dispute Resolution  
 Business Law  
 Canadian Corporate Counsel Association - Ontario Chapter  
 Charity and Not-for-Profit-Law  
 Child and Youth Law  
 Citizenship and Immigration Law  
 Civil Litigation  
 Class Actions Law  
 Constitutional, Civil Liberties and Human Rights Law  
 Construction and Infrastructure Law  
 Criminal Justice  
 Education Law  
 Elder Law  
 Entertainment, Media and Communications Law  
 Environmental Law  
 Family Law  
 Franchise Law  
 Health Law  
 Information Technology and Intellectual Property Law  
 Insolvency Law  
 Insurance Law  
 International Law  
 Labour & Employment Law  
 Law Practice Management  
 Municipal Law  
 Natural Resources and Energy Law  
 Pensions and Benefits Law  
 Privacy and Access to Information Law  
 Public Sector Lawyers  
 Real Property Law  
 Sexual Orientation and Gender Identity Law  
 Sole Small Firm and General Practice  
 Students  
 Taxation Law  
 Trusts and Estates Law  
 Women Lawyers Forum  
 Workers' Compensation  
 Young Lawyers Division

Presidents

List of recent Presidents of the OBA:

 Charlene Theodore 2020-2021
 Colin Stevenson 2019-2020
 Lynne M.J. Vicars 2018-2019
 Quinn M. Ross 2017-2018
 David L. Sterns 2016-2017 
 Edwin G. Upenieks 2015-2016 
 Orlando Da Silva, LSM 2014-2015 
 Pascale Daigneault 2013-2014 
 Morris A. Chochla 2012-2013 
 The Hon. Paul R. Sweeny 2011-2012 
 R. Lee Akazaki 2010-2011 
 The Hon. Carole J. Brown 2009-2010 
 The Hon. Jamie K. Trimble 2008-2009 
 Gregory D. Goulin, LSM 2007-2008 
 James C. Morton 2006-2007 
 The Hon. Heather McGee 2005-2006 
 Ian Kirby 2004-2005 
 Jonathan Speigel 2003-2004 
 Virginia MacLean, Q.C. 2002-2003 
 James F. O’Brien 2001-2002 
 Thomas C. Marshall 2000-2001 
 Susan T. McGrath 1999-2000 
 Steven F. Rosenhek 1998-1999 
 William J. Simpson, Q.C., LSM 1997-1998 
 The Hon. Michelle K. Fuerst 1996-1997 
 Douglas J. Los 1995-1996 
 Igor Ellyn, Q.C. 1994-1995
 D. Kevin Carroll, Q.C. 1994-1995
 Erica L. James 1993-1994
 J. Kenneth Alexander 1992-1993
 Garth Manning, Q.C. 1991-1992
 Thomas G. Heintzman, Q.C., 1989-1990
 J. Douglas Grenkie, Q.C. 1988-1999
 Harvey J. Bliss, Q.C. 1987-1988
 Stephen R. Cameron 1987-1988
 J. Alex Langford 1985-1986
 Thomas E, Evans, Q.C. 1984-1985
 The Hon. Lorraine Gotlib 1983-1984
 Raymond J. Ostiguy 1982-1983
 John R. Finley, Q.C. 1981-1982
 The Hon. Joseph Potts 1980-1981
 The Hon. Mr. Justice John R.R. Jennings 1979-1980
 William H. Kidd, Q.C. 1978-1979

See also
 Law Society of Ontario
 Manitoba Bar Association

References

External links
 Ontario Bar Association

Bar associations of Canada
Bar_Association
1907 establishments in Ontario